This is a list of events that have been held at the Millennium Stadium in Cardiff, Wales:

Association football

UEFA Champions League final
2017 UEFA Champions League Final

Football at the Olympic Games
2012 Summer Olympics (Football Men's Quarter Final)   
2012 Summer Olympics (Football Women's Quarter Final)

FA Community Shield matches
2001 FA Charity Shield
2002 FA Community Shield
2003 FA Community Shield
2004 FA Community Shield
2005 FA Community Shield
2006 FA Community Shield

FA Cup finals
2001 FA Cup Final
2002 FA Cup Final
2003 FA Cup Final
2004 FA Cup Final
2005 FA Cup Final
2006 FA Cup Final

Football League Cup finals
2001 Football League Cup Final
2002 Football League Cup Final
2003 Football League Cup Final
2004 Football League Cup Final
2005 Football League Cup Final
2006 Football League Cup Final
2007 Football League Cup Final

English Football League play-off finals
2001 Football League First Division play-off final
2001 Football League Second Division play-off final
2001 Football League Third Division play-off final
2002 Football League First Division play-off final
2002 Football League Second Division play-off final
2002 Football League Third Division play-off final
2003 Football League First Division play-off final
2003 Football League Second Division play-off final
2003 Football League Third Division play-off final
2004 Football League First Division play-off final
2004 Football League Second Division play-off final
2004 Football League Third Division play-off final
2005 Football League Championship play-off final
2005 Football League One play-off final
2005 Football League Two play-off final
2006 Football League Championship play-off final
2006 Football League One play-off final
2006 Football League Two play-off final

Boxing
Joe Calzaghe vs. Mikkel Kessler
Anthony Joshua vs. Carlos Takam
Anthony Joshua vs. Joseph Parker

Rallying

2005 Wales Rally GB-Millennium Stadium Super Special Stage 
2006 Wales Rally GB-Millennium Stadium Super Special Stage 
2007 Wales Rally GB-Millennium Stadium Super Special Stage 
2008 Wales Rally GB-Millennium Stadium Super Special Stage

Rugby League

Rugby League World Cup
2013 Rugby League World Cup (Opening Ceremony and first two matches)

Rugby League Challenge Cup finals
2003 Challenge Cup Final
2004 Challenge Cup Final
2005 Challenge Cup Final

Magic Weekends
2007 Magic Weekend
2008 Magic Weekend
2011 Magic Weekend

Rugby Union

Rugby World Cup finals and quarter-finals
1999 Rugby World Cup Final
2007 Rugby World Cup Quarter-final
2015 Rugby World Cup Quarter-finals

Six Nations Championship
 2000-date Six Nations Championship

Heineken Cup finals
2002 Heineken Cup Final
2006 Heineken Cup Final
2008 Heineken Cup Final
2011 Heineken Cup Final

Judgement Day
2013-19 Judgement Day

WRU Challenge Cup
2000-2019 WRU Challenge Cup finals

Speedway

Speedway Grand Prix of Great Britain
2001-6 Speedway Grand Prix of Great Britain 
2007 Speedway Grand Prix of Great Britain
2008 Speedway Grand Prix of Great Britain
2009 Speedway Grand Prix of Great Britain
2010 Speedway Grand Prix of Great Britain
2011 Speedway Grand Prix of Great Britain
2012 Speedway Grand Prix of Great Britain
2013 Speedway Grand Prix of Great Britain
2014 Speedway Grand Prix of Great Britain
2015 Speedway Grand Prix of Great Britain
2016 Speedway Grand Prix of Great Britain
2017 Speedway Grand Prix of Great Britain
2018 Speedway Grand Prix of Great Britain
2019 Speedway Grand Prix of Great Britain

Other sporting events
2002 Power Cricket Cup 
Express Eventing International Cup
Monster Jam European Tour (2007, 2008, 2009, 2010, 2016, 2018, 2019)
WWE Clash at the Castle (2022)

Concerts

Michael Forever – The Tribute Concert
Tsunami Relief Cardiff
Welcome to Wales

References

List of events
Cardiff-related lists
Events in Cardiff
Lists of events by venue